Monoxenus bispinosus is a species of beetle in the family Cerambycidae. It was described by Karl Jordan in 1894, originally under the genus Apomempsis. It is known from Cameroon, Equatorial Guinea, Gabon, the Democratic Republic of the Congo, the Republic of the Congo, and the Central African Republic.

References

bispinosus
Beetles described in 1894